Mole people (also called tunnel people or tunnel dwellers) are homeless people living under large cities in abandoned subway, railroad, flood, sewage tunnels, and heating shafts. The term may also refer to the speculative fiction trope of an entirely subterranean society or a race of humanoid moles.

In documentary film and non-fiction
Dark Days, a 2000 documentary feature film by British filmmaker Marc Singer, follows a group of people living in an abandoned section of the New York City Subway, in the area called Freedom Tunnel. Anthropologist Teun Voeten's book Tunnel People is also about the inhabitants of the Freedom Tunnel, where Voeten lived for five months.

Jennifer Toth's 1993 book The Mole People: Life in the Tunnels Beneath New York City, written while she was an intern at the Los Angeles Times, was promoted as a true account of travels in the tunnels and interviews with tunnel dwellers. The book helped canonize the image of the mole people as an ordered society living literally under people's feet. However, few claims in her book have been verified, and it includes inaccurate geographical information, numerous factual errors, and an apparent reliance on largely unprovable statements. The strongest criticism came from New York City Subway historian Joseph Brennan, who declared, "Every fact in this book that I can verify independently is wrong." Cecil Adams's The Straight Dope contacted Toth in 2004, and noted the large amount of unverifiability in her stories, while declaring that the book's accounts seemed to be truthful. A later article, after contact with Brennan, was more skeptical of Toth's truthfulness.

Cities

Other journalists have focused on the underground homeless in New York City as well. Photographer Margaret Morton made the photo book The Tunnel. Filmmaker Marc Singer made the documentary Dark Days in the year 2000, and a similar documentary, Voices in the Tunnels, was released in 2008. In 2010, Teun Voeten published Tunnel People.

Media accounts have reported "mole people" living underneath other cities as well. In the Las Vegas Valley, it is estimated about 1,000 homeless people find shelter in the storm drains underneath the city for protection from extreme temperatures that exceed  while dropping below  in winter.

According to media reports, the people living in the tunnels underneath Las Vegas have managed to furnish their "rooms." In one ABC News report from 2009, a couple, who had been living in the tunnels for five years, had furnished their home with a bed, bookcase and even a makeshift shower. The tunnels are prone to flooding, which can be extremely dangerous for the tunnel's residents. Most lose their belongings regularly, and there have been some reported deaths.

Many tunnel inhabitants have been turned away from the limited charities in Las Vegas. Matt O'Brien, a local author who spent nearly five years exploring life beneath the city to write the book Beneath the Neon, founded the Shine A Light Foundation to help the homeless people taking refuge in the tunnels. The charity helps tunnel residents by providing supplies, such as underwear, bottled water, and food.

Stock character version

There are three distinct stock character versions of mole people that have been used in different media appearances:

 The first and most famous example of "mole people" are the Morlocks, who appear in H.G. Wells's 1895 novel The Time Machine.
 Conceptually linked to the Morlocks are socially isolated, often oppressed and sometimes forgotten subterranean societies, most often seen in science fiction. Examples include Demolition Man, Futurama (in the form of "Sewer Mutants"), C.H.U.D., The IT Crowd, Us, and The Matrix.
 Another version is literally a race of humanoid moles. Examples include The Mole People (1956), Underdog, Tarzan, Lord of the Jungle, ThunderCats, and Johnny Test.

In Marvel Comics, two very different underground "mole people" societies exist: the Morlocks, a society of mutant outcasts, named after the subterranean race from The Time Machine, that live in the abandoned tunnels and sewers beneath New York City; and the inhabitants of Subterranea, a fictional cavernous realm far beneath the Earth's surface where various species of subterranean humanoids exist. The Moloids (or Mole People) are the inhabitants of Subterranea most commonly depicted in the comics. Moloids usually serve as soldiers for the Mole Man, a human from the surface world who discovered Subterranea and subsequently became ruler of the Moloids. Mole Man is frequently an antagonist of the Fantastic Four.

See also
 Avinguda de la Llum
 Sewer alligator
 Underground living
 Urban exploration, the exploration of man-made structures including tunnels as a hobby

Fiction
 K'n-yan, fictional subterranean land in works by H.P. Lovecraft
 Hans Moleman, a recurring character on The Simpsons
 City of Ember, a 2008 film
 Neverwhere, a novel by Neil Gaiman based on the concept
 The novel La Promesse des ténèbres by Maxime Chattam features communities of people living underground in New York City, including the "mole people" who live in the lowest parts. Jennifer Toth's book is cited by the author.

References

Further reading

External links
 NYU Portfolio Review: The Mole People – Jennifer Toth, The Mole People: Life in the Tunnels Beneath New York City – Chicago Review Press, 1993.
 Straight Dope article: Are there really "Mole People" living under the streets of New York City?
 Straight Dope article: The Mole People revisited
 Joseph Brennan – Fantasy in The Mole People
 Teun Voeten – Tunnel People
 Narratively article

Subterranea (geography)
Culture of New York City
Stock characters
Homeless people
Urban decay in the United States
Underground cities
Urban exploration
Urban decay
Science fiction themes
Squatting